Lissopimpla is a genus of parasitoid wasps belonging to the family Ichneumonidae. The species of this genus are found in Australia.

Species
The Lissopimpla includes the following species:

 Lissopimpla albopicta (Walker, 1860) 
 Lissopimpla atra Girault, 1924 
 Lissopimpla excelsa (Costa, 1864)

References

External links
 
 

Ichneumonidae
Ichneumonidae genera